Solanum exiguum is a species of plant in the family Solanaceae. It is endemic to Bolivia.

References

Flora of Bolivia
exiguum
Vulnerable plants
Endemic flora of Bolivia
Taxonomy articles created by Polbot